HMCS Whitehorse is a  that has served in the Canadian Forces since 1998. Whitehorse is the sixth ship of her class. The first vessel named for the city in the Yukon, the ship is assigned to Maritime Forces Pacific (MARPAC) and is homeported at CFB Esquimalt.

Design and description
The Kingston class was designed to fill the minesweeper, coastal patrol and reserve training needs of the Canadian Forces, replacing the s, s and Royal Canadian Mounted Police coastal launches in those roles. In order to perform these varied duties the Kingston-class vessels are designed to carry up to three  ISO containers with power hookups on the open deck aft in order to embark mission-specific payloads. The seven module types available for embarkation include four route survey, two mechanical minesweeping and one bottom inspection modules.

The coastal defence vessels are powered by four Jeumont ANR-53-50 alternators coupled to four Wärtsilä UD 23V12 diesel engines creating . Two LIPS Z-drive azimuth thrusters are driven by two Jeumont CI 560L motors creating  and the Z drives can be rotated 360°.

The Kingston class is equipped with a Kelvin Hughes navigational radar using the I band and a Kelvin Hughes 6000 surface search radar scanning the E and F bands. The vessels carry an AN/SQS-511 towed side scan sonar for minesweeping and a Remote-control Mine Hunting System (RMHS). The vessels are equipped with one Bofors 40 mm/60 calibre Mk 5C gun and two M2 machine guns. The 40 mm gun was declared obsolete and removed from the vessels in 2014. Some of them ended up as museum pieces and on display at naval reserve installations across Canada. The Kingston-class coastal defence vessels have a complement of 37.

Operational history

Whitehorse was laid down on 26 July 1996 by Halifax Shipyards Ltd. at Halifax, Nova Scotia and was launched on 24 February 1997. The ship underwent sea trials off the Atlantic coast before transferring to the west coast of Canada in August 1997. Whitehorse was commissioned into the Canadian Forces on 17 April 1998 at Esquimalt, British Columbia and carries the hull number MM 705.

As part of Operation Caribbe, Whitehorse deployed to the eastern Pacific Ocean with sister ship,  in February 2014. In June 2014, Whitehorse took part in the RIMPAC 2014 naval exercises off southern California.  However, she was ordered to return home after allegations of misconduct, including sexual misconduct, occurred while docked in San Diego. Whitehorse is the first Canadian warship to be withdrawn from an exercise due to "reasons of conduct". The incident contributed to the imposition of tighter restrictions on the availability of alcohol on board Royal Canadian Navy warships which were announced in December 2014.

In February 2015, Whitehorse was deployed as part of Operation Caribbe. In late March, Whitehorse assisted the US Coast Guard in a second drug bust, this time in international waters off El Salvador. Over  of cocaine was seized in the operation. The coastal defence ship returned to Canada on 15 April 2015. Whitehorse towed the damaged vessel to Port McNeill.

During their deployment, Whitehorse performed one seizure of a smuggling vessel. The two ships returned to Canada in December. In 2018, Whitehorse deployed south into the eastern Pacific Ocean as part of Operation Caribbe alongside sister ship . Edmonton and Whitehorse returned to Esquimalt on 3 May. In June and July 2018, Whitehorse and sister ship  were deployed off the coast of southern California while taking part in RIMPAC 2018. Whitehorse and Yellowknife both deployed to the Pacific as part of Operation Caribbe on 15 March 2019. Whitehorse deployed from Esquimalt with Nanaimo on 10 February 2020 for Operation Caribbe off western Central America for three months. The two ships were recalled from their mission early on 19 March due to the COVID-19 pandemic.

References

Notes

Citations

Sources

External links

 HMCS Whitehorse (MM 705) – official website

Fleet of the Royal Canadian Navy
Kingston-class coastal defence vessels
1997 ships
Ships built in Nova Scotia